The 2001 Illinois Fighting Illini football team represented the University of Illinois at Urbana–Champaign in the 2001 NCAA Division I-A football season. They participated as members of the Big Ten Conference. Their home games were played at Memorial Stadium in Champaign, Illinois. Led by senior quarterback Kurt Kittner, the team won the Big Ten Conference title and earned a Sugar Bowl berth, but lost to LSU, 47–34.

Schedule

Roster

References

Illinois
Illinois Fighting Illini football seasons
Big Ten Conference football champion seasons
Illinois Fighting Illini football